Airton Tirabassi (born 12 March 1990) is a Brazilian footballer who plays for Thai League 1 club Port as a centre back.

Club career
Born in Boituva, Airton started his professional career with Rio Branco in 2010. In the following years, he played for Guaratinguetá, Mogi Mirim and CRB.

In 2014, Airton signed with Ituano and with the club, he went on to win the 2014 Campeonato Paulista. After a stint with XV de Piracicaba, on 10 December 2015, Airton switched to São Bento. On 3 May 2016, Airton joined Luverdense on a loan deal. On 17 June, he scored his first goal for the club in a 1–0 victory over Paraná Clube. He left São Bento on 19 December after having made a single appearance in Campeonato Paulista.

Airton signed with Paraná Clube on 13 January 2017. He featured 15 times for the club and scored one goal in a Copa do Brasil match against Vitória. However, after failing to negotiate with the club about his salary, he did not renew his contract. In May 2017, he moved to Serie A club Avaí. On 18 June, he made his debut for the club in a 1–0 defeat against Vasco da Gama.

On 1 January 2019, Airton moved to Ponte Preta.

Club statistics

References

External links

Living people
Association football defenders
Brazilian footballers
Rio Branco Esporte Clube players
Guaratinguetá Futebol players
Mogi Mirim Esporte Clube players
Clube de Regatas Brasil players
Ituano FC players
Esporte Clube XV de Novembro (Piracicaba) players
Esporte Clube São Bento players
Luverdense Esporte Clube players
Paraná Clube players
Avaí FC players
Associação Atlética Ponte Preta players
Campeonato Brasileiro Série D players
Campeonato Brasileiro Série C players
Campeonato Brasileiro Série B players
Campeonato Brasileiro Série A players
Thai League 1 players
Port F.C. players
1990 births